Fingerhut is an American catalog/online retailer.

Fingerhut was founded in 1948 by William Fingerhut and his brother Manny, selling automobile seat covers. In 1952, the business repositioned itself as a mail order catalog company and diversified its goods to include towels, dishes, and tools. In 1969 the company went public. The Fingerhut family was no longer involved in the business after 1979.

In 1994, Fingerhut sponsored the #98 NASCAR Ford Thunderbird for Cale Yarborough Motorsports. Derrike Cope started the year in the #98 car, before he was replaced later on by Jeremy Mayfield. In 1995 the company launched the e-commerce site fingerhut.com. By 1996, Fingerhut was one of the 25 largest credit card issuers in the United States.

Today, Fingerhut is distinguished from other online retailers in that customers can pay with credit, and make monthly payments until their orders are paid off.

The Fingerhut brand has passed through several ownerships during its existence, including onetime ownership by American Can Company (1979) and its successor Primerica, Federated Department Stores (1999), Petters Group Worldwide (2002), and Bain Capital Ventures (2004). Federated Department Stores Inc. (current Macy's, Inc.) acquired this company for US$1.7 billion in 1999. Fingerhut's revenue was US$1.7 billion for the fiscal year that ended in January 2001 (FY 2001). By 2000, Fingerhut had lost US$400 million and Federated Department Stores sold the company in 2002.

The company has received criticism for allegedly engaging in practices such as robocalls.

On March 9, 2020, the company was part of the bankruptcy of Bluestem Brands, Inc. The Chapter 11 bankruptcy was filed in the United States District Court for the District of Delaware.

See also

References

Further reading
 Chandler, Susan, "Data Is Power. Just Ask Fingerhut", Business Week, June 3, 1996, p. 69.
 Jaffe, Thomas, "Thumbs up on Fingerhut?", Forbes, January 21, 1991, p. 124.
 Louis, Arthur M., "Dead-Letter Days for Fingerhut", Fortune, November 1974, pp. 184–190.
 Meyer, Herbert E., "How Fingerhut Beat the Recession", Fortune, November 17, 1980, pp. 102–104.
 Phelps, David, "Pointing a Finger at Fingerhut", Minneapolis Star Tribune, January 10, 1999, p. 1D.

External links
 Company website

American companies established in 1948
Companies that filed for Chapter 11 bankruptcy in 2020
Mail-order retailers
Online retailers of the United States
Retail companies established in 1948